Harsh Vikram Singh (born 20 September 1995) is an Indian cricketer. He made his first-class debut for Bihar in the 2018–19 Ranji Trophy on 20 November 2018. He made his Twenty20 debut on 14 November 2019, for Bihar in the 2019–20 Syed Mushtaq Ali Trophy.

References

External links
 

1995 births
Living people
Indian cricketers
Bihar cricketers
Place of birth missing (living people)